Neocollyris graciliformis is a species of ground beetle in the genus Neocollyris in the family Carabidae. It was described by Mandl in 1982.

References

Graciliformis, Neocollyris
Beetles described in 1982